The National Museum of Mauritania, also known as the National Museum of Nouakchott, is a national museum in Nouakchott, Mauritania. It is located to the southwest of the Hotel Mercure Marhaba, west of Hotel de Ville, northwest of Parc Deydouh, and northeast of the Mosque Ould Abas.

The museum has notable archaeological and ethnographical collections. It contains two galleries that showcase collections of sherds, arrowheads, and local costumes.

The museum building
The National Museum is housed in a two-storey building constructed in 1972 by the Chinese. The building also houses the Mauritanian Institute of Scientific Research, the Mauritanian Manuscripts Conservation Centre and the National Library of Mauritania. The museum consists of two permanent exhibition rooms and a temporary exhibition room.

The collections of the museum
 The archaeological collections on the ground floor show Mousterian, Aterian and Neolithic artifacts as well as holdings from excavations carried out in several historic Mauritanian cities such as Koumbi Saleh, Aoudaghost, Tichit, Ouadane and Azougui.
 The ethnographic collections on the first floor contain objects belonging to different cultures of the Mauritanian society.

Gallery

See also
List of museums in Mauritania
National Archives of Mauritania

References

Buildings and structures in Nouakchott
Museums in Mauritania
Mauritania